Angela Gibson (born March 21, 1949, in Baltimore, Maryland) was a Democratic member of the Maryland House of Delegates, who represented district 41 (Baltimore). Gibson was appointed to the House on February 24, 2017, to replace Nathaniel T. Oaks, who resigned upon appointment to State Senate. Gibson lost the Democratic primary in June 2018.

Election results
2018 Democratic Primary for Maryland House of Delegates – District 41
Voters to choose three:
{| class="wikitable"
! Name !! Votes !! Percent !! Outcome
|- 
| Samuel I. "Sandy" Rosenberg || 7,795 || 17.20% || Won
|- 
| Dalya Attar || 7,773 || 17.10% || Won
|- 
| Tony Bridges || 5,476 || 12.10% || Won
|- 
| Angela C. Gibson || 5,308 || 11.70%
|- 
| Bilal Ali || 5,194 || 11.40%
|- 
| Richard Bruno || 2,996 || 6.60%
|- 
| Tessa Hill-Aston || 2,862 || 6.30%
|- 
| Sean Stinnett || 2,806 || 6.20%
|- 
| Joyce J. Smith || 2,291 || 5.00%
|- 
| George E. Mitchell || 2,101 || 4.60%
|- 
| Walter J. Horton || 773 || 1.70%
|}

References

Democratic Party members of the Maryland House of Delegates
Living people
1949 births
Politicians from Baltimore
Morgan State University alumni
Women state legislators in Maryland
21st-century American women